This list shows all the albums that have been number one on the official chart list in Norway, VG-lista. The albums chart started as a top 20 chart in week 1, 1967 and was later expanded to a top 40 chart.

2005

2006

2007

2008

2009

2010

2011

2012

2013

2014

2015

2016

2017

2018

2019

2020

2021

2022

2023

See also
List of number-one songs in Norway

References

External links
VG-lista archives
Topplista albums page
norwegian-charts.com
Norwegian Album Chart archives

 
Norway
Norwegian music-related lists